Trávnik ( or , Hungarian pronunciation:) is a village and municipality in the Komárno District in the Nitra Region of south-west Slovakia.

Geography 
The village lies at an altitude of 114 metres and covers an area of 18.736 km².
It has a population of about 675 people.

History 
In the 9th century, the territory of Trávnik became part of the Kingdom of Hungary. In historical records the village was first mentioned in 1216.
After the Austro-Hungarian army disintegrated in November 1918, Czechoslovak troops liberated the area, later acknowledged internationally by the Treaty of Trianon. Between 1938 and 1945 Trávnik was occupied by Miklós Horthy's Hungary through the First Vienna Award. From 1945 until the Velvet Divorce, it was part of Czechoslovakia. Since then it has been part of Slovakia.

Ethnicity 
Per 2011 census, the village was about 82% Hungarian, 18% Slovak.

Facilities 
The village has a public library and a  football pitch.

Villages and municipalities in the Komárno District
Hungarian communities in Slovakia